Diary of a Wimpy Kid: Cabin Fever is a 2011 bestselling and award-winning children's book and the sixth book in the Diary of a Wimpy Kid series, written by American author Jeff Kinney. The book was released on November 15, 2011, the paperback edition was released on January 31, 2013 and was the fastest-selling book of 2011, giving him the third-strongest opening-week sales for a children's author. Cabin Fever had a first printing run of six million copies, which Amulet Books stated was one of their most significant titles for that year. In 2012 Kinney won a "Best Author" Children's Choice Award from the Children's Book Council for Cabin Fever. The book received widespread acclaim from critics and fans alike and is generally considered the best book in the series. The book was followed by 2012's The Third Wheel.

Plot
The story starts before Christmas, when Greg Heffley wants to behave well to get really good gifts for the holidays. In addition, his mother obtains a doll which she calls "Santa's Scout" that is meant to keep track of how he behaves and make his behavior better. Greg is afraid of this doll because he thinks that it might actually send information to Santa.

Greg starts playing an online game called "Net Kritterz" that is based around treating a virtual pet and requires paid features. Greg's mom, Susan, doesn't want to give him money to spend on the site and says he has to earn money on his own. Greg tries some bad ideas for getting money until he finds out that he can buy "Drummies", tasty fried chicken snacks that are sold at his school's holiday bazaar, for less than the school sells them for, so he decides to start his own holiday bazaar and invites his best friend Rowley to do it with him. They first attempt to build a cardboard home-made version of Pac-Man, which fails to work. They realize they need to advertise their bazaar and try to ask the local newspaper to do it. However, they discover the newspaper's advertising fee is very expensive, so they try to establish their own newspaper, The Neighborhood Tattler. When a string of conflicts and failures prevent them from making their paper a reality, they decide to hang up posters that advertise their bazaar in their town, starting with the school, but rain causes all the ink to bleed on the school's walls, leaving green stains that won't come off. After narrowly escaping with only their face shapes noted, the school administrators and police search for the culprits: they ask the whole student body to tell them who did it anonymously. Scared of getting caught, Rowley leaves a note at the principal's desk anonymously saying "Me and Greg Heffley vandalized the school." Greg explains to the principal that he hadn't meant to vandalize the school. The vice principal asks Greg if he would like to name his partner, but Greg refuses to avoid sending his friend into trauma, and agrees to scrub the dye off himself. When Greg arrives home, he discovers a note from the police stating they visited to find nobody home and that they will return later; believing the vice principal went back on his word and has sold his name to them, Greg contemplates how he'll have to avoid his arrest.

A blizzard suddenly hits town, shutting the family in their home and forcing Greg's father, Frank, to stay in a hotel during work. At one point, the electricity goes off and his family becomes extremely cold, nearly running short on food. After several days, Rowley visits and tells Greg that everyone else in their street has electricity, so Greg checks the power box and realizes that the power is down in all of the rooms except for the room of his little brother Manny. The family finds Manny living luxuriously in his room surrounded by food, warmth, and toys without notifying anyone because, as Manny claims, nobody taught him how to tie his shoes. Greg switches the power back on to the entire house, the blizzard ends, the snow is plowed out, and Frank comes home with food just in time.

Before Christmas, Susan asks Greg to take a gift to the police station to place in their toy drive box. Afraid of spending the holidays in prison, Greg manages to do so stealthily, but when he's near the church, he realizes he asked for money at the Giving Tree earlier, requesting his gift to be placed under the recycling bin, and shovels the snow from their entire driveway to find it. He eventually finds the bin, but is disappointed to find no cash. When Greg comes home, the police arrive to his horror, but it is revealed they were only asking for toys for the toy drive. After awkwardly offering them a used toy that they reject, the officers leave. Christmas finally arrives, as Greg breathes relief that he's not wanted after all, and he spends the holidays with the gifts he got. Later, Greg discovers the newspaper praising his act of clearing the church driveway to allow a soup kitchen to operate because so many businesses closed during the blizzard, although the face mask he wore prevents his actual recognition. He promptly publishes a photo of himself in The Neighborhood Tattler, stating he is the one who shoveled the driveway.

Proposed television special
In December 2012, Jeff Kinney announced that he was working on an animated adaptation of Cabin Fever to air around Christmas 2013. In August 2013, Kinney stated it would be a half-hour television special, and would air on Fox in late 2014. As of March 2023, no updates on the special have been announced.

References

Cabin Fever
2011 American novels
Christmas novels
2011 children's books
Novels by Jeff Kinney
Amulet Books books
Puffin Books books